Foley may refer to:

Places
United States
Foley, Alabama
Foley, Florida, a community in Taylor County, Florida
Foley, Minnesota
Foley, Missouri
Foley Field, baseball stadium in Athens, Georgia
Foley Square in Manhattan

Canada
Foley Island, Nunavut
Foley Mountain Conservation Area, Ontario

Northern Ireland
Foley, County Armagh, a townland in County Armagh

People
Foley (surname), a list of people with the surname 
Foley (band), New Zealand pop duo 
Baron Foley, British peerage title
Foley (musician), Miles Davis sideman 1987–1991

Fiction
Miss Foley, a fictional character from the novel Something Wicked This Way Comes

Technology 
 Foley (filmmaking), a process or a studio for creating sound effects used to enhance film or video soundtrack
 Foley catheter, the most common type of indwelling urinary catheter

Ships
, more than one ship of the British Royal Navy
, a United States Navy destroyer escort in commission from August to October 1945

See also
Foli, a surname and given name
Foly, a surname
Foley's department store of Houston, Texas
Foley Building (disambiguation)